Disoidemata is a genus of moths in the subfamily Arctiinae. The genus was erected by George Hampson in 1900.

Species
 Disoidemata osmophora
 Disoidemata quadriplaga

References

External links

Lithosiini
Moth genera